William Charles Goddard Knowles, CBE, MA, LLD, JP (12 January 1908 – 13 January 1969) was a British businessman in Hong Kong. He was general manager of the Butterfield and Swire, chairman of the Cathay Pacific Airways, member of the Legislative Council and the Executive Council and vice-chancellor of the University of Hong Kong.

Biography
Knowles was born in Bombay, British India on 12 January 1908. He was educated at Christ's Hospital, Sussex, and Trinity College, Cambridge. After he graduated he joined Butterfield and Swire and its parent company in London. From 1929 to 39, he worked in different Chinese cities including Yangtze ports, Hong Kong, Tientsin and Shanghai.

He served in the Indian Army during the Second World War and resumed his office at Butterfield and Swire in Shanghai after the war ended. He moved to Hong Kong in 1947 and was appointed general manager of the company in 1957. He was also chairman of associated companies such as Taikoo Dockyard and Engineering Co. Ltd., Taikoo, Sugar Refining Co. Ltd., Duro Paint Manufacturing Co. Ltd., Swire and MacLaine, Ltd., Cathay Pacific Airways Ltd. and the Hong Kong Aircraft Engineering Co. Ltd. He was also a director and later the chairman of the Hongkong and Shanghai Banking Corporation and a director of the Hong Kong Land Investment and Agency Co. Ltd. and the Union Insurance Society of Canton.

Besides his business positions, he served on the committee of the Hong Kong General Chamber of Commerce from 1961 to 62 and was the chairman of the chamber for two years. He was also appointed founding chairman of the Hong Kong Tourist Association and member of the Legislative Council (1961–64) and the Executive Council of Hong Kong.

Knowles was manager of Butterfield and Swire until he served briefly in the office of vice-chancellor of the University of Hong Kong, in succession to Sir Lindsay Ride, from 1964 to 1965. He had been member of the Court and Council from 1958 and treasurer of the university in 1962.

In recognition of his services to the colony and to the university he was awarded the honorary degree of Doctor of Laws in 1964. He was also awarded Commander of the Order of the British Empire (CBE) for his public service in 1965. Knowles Building in the University of Hong Kong campus is named after him. A character named Quillan Gornt in the novel Noble House is based on Knowles and John Kidston Swire, the two taipans of Butterfield and Swire.

He held the position of executive director of Lloyd's Register of Shipping when he died suddenly on a business trip in Jakarta, Indonesia on 13 January 1969.

References

External links
 Time To Remember – Interview with Bill Knowles

1908 births
1969 deaths
Military personnel of British India
Indian Army personnel of World War II
British Indian Army personnel
People educated at Christ's Hospital
Alumni of Trinity College, Cambridge
British businesspeople in shipping
British expatriates in China
British expatriates in Hong Kong
Hong Kong shipping businesspeople
Hong Kong chief executives
Hong Kong justices of the peace
Cathay Pacific
Swire Group
Chairmen of HSBC
Members of the Legislative Council of Hong Kong
Members of the Executive Council of Hong Kong
Heads of universities in Hong Kong
Vice-Chancellors of the University of Hong Kong
Commanders of the Order of the British Empire